Otitoma carnicolor is a species of sea snail, a marine gastropod mollusk in the family Pseudomelatomidae.

Description
The length of the shell varies between 6 mm and 8 mm.

Distribution
This marine species occurs off the Loyalty Islands and New Caledonia.

References

 Hervier J. (1896 ["1895"]). Descriptions d’espèces nouvelles de l’Archipel Néo-Calédonien. Journal de Conchyliologie. 43(3): 141-152
 Wiedrick S.G. (2014). Review of the genera Otitoma Jousseaume, 1880 and Thelecytharella with the description of two new species Gastropoda: Conoidea: Pseudomelatomidae) from the southwest Pacific Ocean. The Festivus. 46(3): 40-53
 Fischer-Piette, E., 1950. Liste des types décrits dans le Journal de Conchyliologie et conservés dans la collection de ce journal (avec planches)(suite). Journal de Conchyliologie 90: 149-180

External links
  Tucker, J.K. 2004 Catalog of recent and fossil turrids (Mollusca: Gastropoda). Zootaxa 682:1-1295
  Morassi M., Nappo A. & Bonfitto A. (2017). New species of the genus Otitoma Jousseaume, 1898 (Pseudomelatomidae, Conoidea) from the Western Pacific Ocean. European Journal of Taxonomy. 304: 1-30
 Kilburn R.N. (2004) The identities of Otitoma and Antimitra (Mollusca: Gastropoda: Conidae and Buccinidae). African Invertebrates, 45: 263-270
 MNHN: specimen
 Gastropods.com: Otitoma carnicolor

carnicolor
Gastropods described in 1952